Denmark competed at the 2015 European Games, in Baku, Azerbaijan from 12 to 28 June 2015.

The National Olympic Committee and Sports Confederation of Denmark has of April 2015 selected 25 athletes for the Danish team.

Medalists

Archery

Boxing

 Men's 56 kg – Frederik Lundgaard Jensen
 Men's 75 kg – Mike Steffensen
 Men's 91 kg – Jim Hassenteufel Andreasen
 Women's 64 kg – Camilla Skov Jensen

Canoeing

 Men's K1 – René Holten Poulsen

Cycling

BMX
 Men's race – Niklas Laustsen, Klaus Bøgh Andresen
 Women's race – Simone Tetsche Christensen

Diving

 Men's events – Andreas Sargent Larsen, Martin Christensen

Fencing

Men's individual épée – Frederik von der Osten
Men's individual foil – Alexander Bøgeskov-Tsoronis

Gymnastics

Artistic

 Men's – Helge Vammen
 Women's – Mette Hulgaard, Michelle Vitting Lauritsen, Linnea Højer Wang

Judo

 Men's 100 kg – Frederik Jørgensen

Karate

 Men's kata – Christopher Skotte Rohde Christensen

Swimming

 Men's – Frederik Jessen, Philip Alfred Ravnsholt Greve, Tobias Bjerg
 Women's – Emily Rosemary Gantriis, Helena Rosendahl Bach, Josefine Brosolat Pedersen, Josephine Marie Holm, Julie Kepp Jensen, Merete Toft Jensen, Signe Wiegant Bro, Trine Kjøngerskov, Victoria Christine Bierre

Table tennis

Men's singles – Jonathan Groth

Taekwondo

Women's 49 kg – Sarah Malykke

Triathlon

Men's – Casper Stenderup

Volleyball

Beach
 Men's – Peter Kildegaard Andersen / Kristoffer Abell
 Women's – Helle Søndergård / Line Trans Hansen

References

Nations at the 2015 European Games
European Games
2015